The Great Britain Water Polo junior teams are the national teams that represent Great Britain at youth level in the sport of Water Polo. There are male and female national junior teams, which compete internationally at the U-17 and U-20 level.

On March 15, 2015 the Great Britain U-17 women's water polo team qualified to compete in the 2015 European Games, after succeeding in the qualifying tournament held in Nice, France. The Great Britain U-17 men's water polo team failed to qualify, losing out by one goal to Malta.

Great Britain U-17 Women's Team

Results

Baku 2015 European Games Qualifying Tournament Results  

The Great Britain U-17 Women's Team Qualified for the 2015 European Games.

Baku 2015 European Games Results 

In the 2015 European Games, the GB U-17 women's team came 11th, beating Israel twice and narrowly losing to Germany.

Roster 
The following is the Great Britain U-17 women's water polo roster of the 2015 European Games.

Head Coach: Nick Buller.
Assistant Coach: Ant McGuinness.
Team Manager: Sue Webb.
Team Doctor: Adrian Lim.
Team Physio: Victoria O'Donnell.

Video Highlights 
Long-range goal by Lucy Shaw against Israel

GB U-17 Men's Team

Results

2015 European Games Qualifying Tournament Results  

The Great Britain U-17 Men's Team did not qualify for the 2015 European Games. It is noted that this was the Great Britain U-17 men's team's first international competition as a team.

References

External links
 GB Girls set for Baku 2015
 Official GB U17 Baku 2015 Media Pack 

Water polo in the United Kingdom